The 1996 IGA Classic singles was a women's tennis tournament.  Brenda Schultz-McCarthy was the defending champion and won in the final 6–3, 6–2 against Amanda Coetzer.

Seeds
A champion seed is indicated in bold text while text in italics indicates the round in which that seed was eliminated.

  Chanda Rubin (semifinals)
  Brenda Schultz-McCarthy (champion)
  Amanda Coetzer (final)
  Amy Frazier (quarterfinals)
  Lisa Raymond (quarterfinals)
  Joannette Kruger (quarterfinals)
  Elena Likhovtseva (semifinals)
  Florencia Labat (second round)

Draw

External links
 1996 IGA Classic Draw

1996 Singles
1996 WTA Tour